E. A. Belyaev (Evgenie Aleksandrovich Belyaev) (1895–1964) was an Islamic scholar and a prominent Soviet Islamist and member of the Institute of Asian Peoples of the Academy of Sciences of the USSR.

Works
Arabs, Islam and the Arab Caliphate in the Early Middle Ages

See also
List of Islamic scholars

References

1895 births
1964 deaths
Islam in Russia